Neobythitoides serratus is a species of cusk-eel found in the East China Sea near the Ryukyu Islands.  It is found at a depth of at least .  This species grows to a length of  SL.  It is the only known member of its genus.

References

Ophidiidae

Fish described in 2006